Kouba may refer to:
 Kouba, Algeria
 Kouka, Banwa in Burkina Faso
 Chamb, a river in Germany and the Czech Republic, known as "Kouba" in Czech
 Pavel Kouba, Czech footballer
 Petr Kouba, Czech footballer